Design, Automation & Test in Europe, or DATE is a yearly conference on the topic of electronic design automation.  It is typically held in March or April of each year, alternating between France and Germany. It is sponsored by the SIGDA of the Association for Computing Machinery, the Electronic System Design Alliance, the European Design and Automation Association (EDAA), and the IEEE Council on Electronic Design Automation (CEDA).
Technical co-sponsors include ACM SIGBED, the IEEE Solid-State Circuits Society (SSCS), IFIP, and the Institution of Engineering and Technology (IET).

DATE is a combination of an technical conference and a small trade show. It was formed in 1998 as a merger of EDAC, ETC, Euro-ASIC, and Euro-DAC.

See also 
electronic design automation
EDA Software Category
Design Automation Conference
International Conference on Computer-Aided Design
Asia and South Pacific Design Automation Conference
Symposia on VLSI Technology and Circuits

References

External links 
Web page for the DATE conference
dblp: Design, Automation, and Test in Europe

IEEE conferences
Association for Computing Machinery conferences
Electronic design automation conferences
International conferences in Germany
International conferences in France